Viðarsson is an Icelandic surname. Notable people with the surname include:

Arnar Viðarsson (born 1978), Icelandic footballer
Bjarni Viðarsson (born 1988), Icelandic footballer
Davíð Viðarsson (born 1984), Icelandic footballer

Icelandic-language surnames